Tango Lorca is an American tango ensemble from Kansas City, Missouri, United States.

Members
Beau Bledsoe (guitar) (1999–Present)
Mark Lowrey (piano)
Jeff Harshbarger (bass)

Former members
Lidia Kaminska (accordion)
Tiffany Thompson (violin)
Christine Brebes (violin)
Brad Cox (piano)
Pablo Motta (contrabass)

Vocalists
Karim Memi
Nathan Granner

Discography

Albums
Mujer Sola (2003)

External links
Official website

Tango in the United States
Musical groups from Kansas City, Missouri